Lygniodes plateni is a moth of the family Erebidae. It is found on the Philippines, including Palawan.

References

Moths described in 1890
Lygniodes